A HUD auction is a form of foreclosure auction except the original lender was a federal agency instead of a private lender. The United States Department of Housing and Urban Development (HUD), is the insurer of loans made through a variety of government programs, particularly FHA loans. When a lender forecloses on a government insured loan, HUD takes possession of the property. 

Homes are listed on the Multiple Listing Service by a listing agent who generally receives a 1% commission for listing the property, but is otherwise unaffiliated with HUD.

External links
 Department of Housing

Mortgage industry of the United States
Real estate in the United States
Governmental auctions
United States Department of Housing and Urban Development
Foreclosure